The 2022 US Open described in detail, in the form of day-by-day summaries.

Day 1 (August 29) 
 Seeds out:
 Men's Singles:  Stefanos Tsitsipas [4],  Taylor Fritz [10],  Roberto Bautista Agut [16],  Francisco Cerúndolo [24],  Maxime Cressy [30],  Nikoloz Basilashvili [31]
 Women's Singles:  Simona Halep [7],  Daria Kasatkina [10],  Martina Trevisan [27],  Jil Teichmann [30]
 Schedule of Play

Day 2 (August 30) 
 Seeds out:
 Women's Singles:  Emma Raducanu [11],  Jeļena Ostapenko [16],  Amanda Anisimova [24],  Elena Rybakina [25],  Elise Mertens [32]
 Schedule of Play

Day 3 (August 31) 
There were major upsets that rocked the women's singles. Two of the top three seeds were knocked out. Anett Kontaveit and Maria Sakkari both lost to unseeded players. Also, the children of former champions Tracy Austin and Hana Mandlíková both lost in the second round.

 Seeds out:
 Men's Singles:  Félix Auger-Aliassime [6],  Botic van de Zandschulp [21]
 Women's Singles:  Anett Kontaveit [2],  Maria Sakkari [3],  Leylah Fernandez [14],  Beatriz Haddad Maia [15],  Barbora Krejcikova [23]
 Men's Doubles:  Marcel Granollers /  Horacio Zeballos [5],  Nicolas Mahut /  Édouard Roger-Vasselin [16]
 Schedule of Play

Day 4 (September 1) 
Fourteen-time major doubles champions Serena and Venus Williams played in their final doubles match as a team, losing to Lucie Hradecká and Linda Nosková in straight sets.
 Seeds out:
 Men's Singles:  Hubert Hurkacz [8],  Grigor Dimitrov [17],  Borna Ćorić [25],  Miomir Kecmanović [32]
 Women's Singles:  Paula Badosa [4],  Ekaterina Alexandrova [28]
 Men's Doubles:  Rohan Bopanna /  Matwé Middelkoop [9],  Santiago González /  Andrés Molteni [14]
 Women's Doubles:  Coco Gauff /  Jessica Pegula [2]
 Mixed Doubles:  Giuliana Olmos /  Marcelo Arévalo [3]
 Schedule of Play

Day 5 (September 2) 
Twenty-three time major champion Serena Williams played in her final professional match of her career, losing to Ajla Tomljanović in three sets.
 Seeds out:
 Men's Singles:  Alex de Minaur [18],  Tommy Paul [29]
 Women's Singles:  Madison Keys [20],  Shelby Rogers [31]
 Men's Doubles:  Ivan Dodig /  Austin Krajicek [7],  Jamie Murray /  Bruno Soares [10],  Kevin Krawietz /  Andreas Mies [12]
 Women's Doubles:  Veronika Kudermetova /  Elise Mertens [1],  Alicja Rosolska /  Erin Routliffe [16]
 Mixed Doubles:  Yang Zhaoxuan /  Rohan Bopanna [6],  Demi Schuurs /  Matwé Middelkoop [8]
 Schedule of Play

Day 6 (September 3) 
 Seeds out:
 Men's Singles:  Diego Schwartzman [14],  Denis Shapovalov [19],  Dan Evans [20],  Lorenzo Musetti [26],  Holger Rune [28]
 Women's Singles:  Garbiñe Muguruza [9],  Belinda Bencic [13]
 Mixed Doubles:  Jessica Pegula /  Austin Krajicek [5],  Ellen Perez /  Michael Venus [7]
 Schedule of Play

Day 7 (September 4) 
 Seeds out:
 Men's Singles:  Daniil Medvedev [1],  Pablo Carreño Busta [12]
 Women's Singles:  Veronika Kudermetova [18],  Alison Riske-Amritraj [29]
 Men's Doubles:  Simone Bolelli /  Fabio Fognini [15]
 Women's Doubles:  Anna Danilina /  Beatriz Haddad Maia [8],  Asia Muhammad /  Ena Shibahara [9],  Alexa Guarachi /  Andreja Klepač [13],  Shuko Aoyama /  Chan Hao-ching [15]
 Mixed Doubles:  Desirae Krawczyk /  Neal Skupski [1]
 Schedule of Play

Day 8 (September 5) 
 Seeds out:
 Men's Singles:  Rafael Nadal [2],  Cameron Norrie [7],  Marin Čilić [15]
 Women's Singles:  Danielle Collins [19],  Petra Kvitová [21],  Victoria Azarenka [26]
 Men's Doubles:  Tim Pütz /  Michael Venus [4],  Thanasi Kokkinakis /  Nick Kyrgios [8]
 Women's Doubles:  Lyudmyla Kichenok /  Jeļena Ostapenko [4], Xu Yifan /  Yang Zhaoxuan [7],  Marta Kostyuk /  Zhang Shuai [11]
 Schedule of Play

Day 9 (September 6) 
 Seeds out:
 Men's Singles:  Matteo Berrettini [13],  Nick Kyrgios [23]
 Women's Singles:  Coco Gauff [12]
 Men's Doubles:  Nikola Mektić /  Mate Pavić [6],  Lloyd Glasspool /  Harri Heliövaara [11]
 Schedule of Play

Day 10 (September 7) 
The match between Jannik Sinner and Carlos Alcaraz became the latest ever finish in the history of the tournament, Alcaraz won the match at 2:50 am ET the following day, surpassed the previous record of 2:26 am three times. It was the second longest match in the tournament at 5 hours and 15 minutes.
 Seeds out:
 Men's Singles:  Andrey Rublev [9],  Jannik Sinner [11]
 Women's Singles:  Jessica Pegula [8],  Karolína Plíšková [22]
 Women's Doubles:  Gabriela Dabrowski /  Giuliana Olmos [5],  Desirae Krawczyk /  Demi Schuurs [6],  Caroline Garcia /  Kristina Mladenovic  [14]
 Mixed Doubles:  Zhang Shuai /  Mate Pavić [2]
 Schedule of Play

Day 11 (September 8) 
The start of the women's singles match at Arthur Ashe Stadium was given a two-minute moment of silence for the death of British Queen Elizabeth II, who died at 10:10 am ET and a public announcement was made three hours later at 1:30 pm ET.

 Seeds out:
 Women's Singles:  Aryna Sabalenka [6],  Caroline Garcia [17]
 Men's Doubles:  Marcelo Arévalo /  Jean-Julien Rojer [3],  Juan Sebastián Cabal /  Robert Farah [13]
 Women's Doubles:  Nicole Melichar-Martinez /  Ellen Perez [10]
 Schedule of Play

Day 12 (September 9) 
 Seeds out:
 Men's Singles:  Frances Tiafoe [22],  Karen Khachanov [27]
 Men's Doubles:  Wesley Koolhof /  Neal Skupski [2]
 Women's Doubles:  Caroline Dolehide  /  Storm Sanders [12]
 Schedule of Play

Day 13 (September 10) 
 Seeds out:
 Women's Singles:  Ons Jabeur [5]
 Schedule of Play

Day 14 (September 11) 
Barbora Krejčíková and Kateřina Siniaková became the first team to complete the elusive Super Slam by winning all four majors, the Olympics and the WTA Finals.
 Seeds out:
 Men Singles:  Casper Ruud [5]
 Schedule of Play

References

Day-by-day summaries
US Open (tennis) by year – Day-by-day summaries